Kommen is an Ortsgemeinde – a municipality belonging to a Verbandsgemeinde, a kind of collective municipality – in the Bernkastel-Wittlich district in Rhineland-Palatinate, Germany.

Geography

Location 
The municipality lies in the northern Hunsrück. The nearest middle centre is Bernkastel-Kues. Kommen belongs to the Verbandsgemeinde of Bernkastel-Kues, whose seat is in the like-named town.

Climate 
Kommen lies within the temperate zone.

History 
In 922, Kommen had its first documentary mention as Cuminu. Until 1802 it formed a unified municipality with Longkamp.

Politics

Municipal council 
The municipal council is made up of 6 council members, who were elected by majority vote at the municipal election held on 7 June 2009, and the honorary mayor as chairman.

Coat of arms 
The municipality's arms might be described thus: Argent a chevron reversed gules, the ends in chief and the point at the base, surmounted on each side by a scythe blade of the field, the points to base.

The reversed (that is, upside down) chevron forms a V, which is meant to stand for the village's patron saint, Valentine, and the scythe blades refer to the agriculture that is the villagers’ main livelihood even today.

The arms have been borne since 8 November 1962.

Culture and sightseeing 
The village chapel goes back to 1730.

Economy and infrastructure 
Public transport in Kommen is integrated into the Verkehrsverbund Region Trier (VRT), whose fares therefore apply. Since September 2008, Kommen has had at its disposal a “youth room”, which was built almost exclusively by the village youth and with help from a few professionals from the municipality.

References

External links 

Kommen 

Bernkastel-Wittlich